The Voerster's Independent Company of Sappers and Miners was an independent company of military engineers that served in the Union Army during the American Civil War.

The Company was organized in St. Louis, Missouri under the authority of Major General John C. Frémont. The company was intended to provide engineering and pioneer support to the Army of the West operating at that time in the state of Missouri. While the company was subsequently consolidated with other organizations, it appears to have continued to carry out specialized engineering functions, at least thought the end of 1862 and possibly later.

Service
Attached to Army of the West and Unattached District of Southwest Missouri, Dept. of Missouri. Engaged in road repair and construction between Rolla and Springfield, Missouri.

On March 18, 1862, Special Orders No. 43 of the Adjutant General of Missouri ordered Voerster's Independent Company of Sappers and Miners consolidated with other units to form the 5th Missouri Volunteer Infantry. The company appears to have continues to be considered to be a specialized company of engineering specialists.

On December 3, 1862, the company (commanded by Captain J. E. Hensler), and by then known as Company "I (Sappers and Miners)", 5th Missouri Volunteer Infantry, was reassigned, becoming Company "I",  35th Missouri Volunteer Infantry. The history of the "Company of Sappers and Miners" merges with the 35th Missouri from this point.

At least some of the members of Company "I" were subsequently transferred to the 1st Regiment Missouri Volunteer Engineers.

Commanders
 Captain J. D. Voester
 Captain John E. Hensler, 
 1st Lt Christian Lochbuler
 2nd Lt John Krebs

See also
Missouri Civil War Union units

External links
 Muster roll of J. D. Voerster's Company of Pioneers (Sappers, Miners and Pontoniers), at Missouri Secretary of State Digital Heritage web site
 Muster roll of Co "I" "Sappers and Miners" of the 5th Missouri Volunteer Infantry, formerly Voerster's Independent Company of Sappers and Miners. Interactive image is from the Missouri History Museum.

Notes and references

 Dyer, Frederick H. A Compendium of the War of the Rebellion (Des Moines, IA:  Dyer Pub. Co.), 1908.
 

Units and formations of the Union Army from Missouri
Military units and formations established in 1861
1861 establishments in Missouri
Military units and formations disestablished in 1862
Engineer units and formations of the Union Army